The rufous mouse opossum (Marmosa lepida) or little rufous mouse opossum is an opossum species from South America. The species has been found in Bolivia, Suriname, French Guinea, Brazil, Colombia, Ecuador, Guyana, Peru and Suriname in lowland tropical rainforest at altitudes from 100 to 1000 m. It is presumed to feed on insects and fruit, like its close relatives.

It is considered a monotype. It is smaller in size and has a brighter red colored fur, distinguishing it from other congeners.

Though the species has been known for over a century, very few specimens have been studied, most of these from areas below 600m and taken from western edges of the Amazon basin and Guianas. Its dorsal pelage is reddish-brown and its ventral pelage is grayish. Researchers believe this coloring is product of adaptation to a humid forest environment.

References

Opossums
Marsupials of South America
Mammals of Bolivia
Mammals of Brazil
Mammals of Colombia
Mammals of Ecuador
Mammals of Guyana
Mammals of Peru
Mammals of Suriname
Fauna of the Amazon
Mammals described in 1888
Taxa named by Oldfield Thomas